The Gadek Hot Spring is a hot spring in Alor Gajah, Melaka, Malaysia.

History
The area around the hot spring was firstly developed in the 1980s and has been improved over time as a popular tourist attraction.

Geology
The hot spring has a surface temperature of 56 °C with an average water flow of 5.4 litres per minute, containing hydrogen sulphite gas.

Facilities
The hot spring is equipped with restaurant, food stalls, children's playground, outdoor swimming pool and bathrooms.

Opening time
The hot spring opens everyday from 7.00 a.m. to 9.00 p.m.

See also
 Geography of Malaysia

References

Geography of Malacca
Hot springs of Malaysia
Tourist attractions in Malacca